Dypingite is a hydrated magnesium carbonate mineral with the formula:  Mg5(CO3)4(OH)2·5H2O.  Its type locality is the Dypingdal serpentine-magnesite deposit, Snarum, Norway.

References

Magnesium minerals
Carbonate minerals
Monoclinic minerals